
Gmina Lubiewo is a rural gmina (administrative district) in Tuchola County, Kuyavian-Pomeranian Voivodeship, in north-central Poland.

The gmina contains part of the protected area called Tuchola Landscape Park.

Villages
Gmina Lubiewo contains the villages and settlements of Bruchniewo, Brukniewo, Bysław, Bysławek, Cierplewo, Klonowo, Koźliny, Lubiewice, Lubiewo, Minikowo, Płazowo, Sokole-Kuźnica, Sucha, Szumiąca, Szyszkówka, Teolog, Trutnowo, Wandowo, Wełpin, Wielonek and Zamrzenica.

Neighbouring gminas
Gmina Lubiewo is bordered by the gminas of Cekcyn, Gostycyn, Koronowo and Świekatowo.

References
Polish official population figures 2006

Lubiewo
Tuchola County